PsyDok is a repository for psychology supported by Saarland University and State Library (Germany) with a Special Subject Collection Psychology since 2003. As an open access system, they publish documents free of charge as articles from journals but also other types of documents.

PsyDok provides findings by using extended search, the enriched search and simple search or by using indexes as the American Psychological Association's Classification and Indexing System.

PsyDok has got the  certificate of quality for publication services by the German Initiative for Networked Information (Deutsche Initiative für Netzwerkinformation DINI).

External links
  (archive of previous official website)
 American Psychological Association
 American Psychological Association's Style

Open-access archives